Billy Connolly's Route 66 is a British travel documentary television series presented by Scottish comedian and actor Billy Connolly. It focuses on his travels along the famous United States highway, Route 66. The series, which consisted of four episodes, was shown on the British television network ITV.

Production
Footage for the series was shot between April and June 2011.  Connolly rode a trike the entire length of the  route, despite being hospitalized for a week after he crashed at the border near Arizona and New Mexico, which resulted in a broken rib and a gash in his knee. Unlike Connolly's previous travelogues this series does not feature Connolly performing stand up comedy on his travels and purely focuses on the sights and the people that Connolly meets along the way.

Episodes
In the first episode, Connolly's journey along Route 66 begins in Chicago, Illinois (the start of Route 66), and reaches St. Louis, Missouri, as an initial destination.  The show features the Willis Tower (the tallest building in the United States at the time) as a lead-in to Connolly's meeting with an Illinois champion pie-maker, an Amish family, and two female St. Louis residents whose homes were destroyed by a tornado.

The second episode starts where the first one finished—in St. Louis, with Connolly climbing the Gateway Arch. Now in the American West, Connolly visits a wolf sanctuary, participates in a Civil War re-enactment, hunts for turkey, sits in the world's largest rocking chair, and visits a memorial commemorating the victims of the 1995 Oklahoma City bombing, in which 168 people lost their lives in the Alfred P. Murrah Federal Building.

In the third episode, Connolly joins a cattle drive in Oklahoma City before moving onward to Texas to visit the ghost town of Glenrio and the Devil's Rope Museum. He later meets two men who helped to create the atomic bomb in Los Alamos, New Mexico before taking part in a rodeo in Arizona.

In the fourth and final episode of Route 66, Connolly visits a massive meteorite crater as well as the Grand Canyon in Arizona. He takes the viewers into a sanctuary for unwanted exotic pets where he feeds a lion cub and talks to a campaigner who was trying to keep the historic Route 66 alive. Connolly's journey concludes at the end of Route 66 in Santa Monica.

Ratings

See also 
 Billy Connolly: Journey to the Edge of the World

References

2011 British television series debuts
2011 British television series endings
Billy Connolly
British documentary television series
British travel television series
ITV (TV network) original programming
U.S. Route 66